Rhodogeron is a genus of flowering plants in the tribe Inuleae within the family Asteraceae.

Species
The only known species is Rhodogeron coronopifolius, found only in Cuba.

References

Monotypic Asteraceae genera
Inuleae
Endemic flora of Cuba